Polish Karate Federation (PZK, pol. Polski Związek Karate) is a Polish organization associating among others shōtōkan karate clubs. It belongs to the World Karate Federation committee.

Olympic Karate 
In 2016, the International Olympic Committee adopted a resolution on karate as the thirtieth Olympic discipline to perform at the 2020 Summer Olympics in Tokyo. The Polish Olympic Committee granted legal membership for the Polish Karate Association. According to the decision of the Ministry of Sport and Tourism in Poland, PZK is the only organization that can represent and use Polish national symbols when participating in foreign competitions.

Operation
PZK issues competition, coaching and referee licenses. The union is subject to five committees: technical-qualified sport, judges, children and youth, mass sports events and sport of disabled people. Commissions are subject to regulations and are appointed by PZK management. The organization's goal is to promote and educate karate in Poland.

Structure 
The association, as of March 2014, associates 197 kyokushin clubs, shōtōkan clubs and 11 district associations. The Federation's governing bodies are:

 General Meeting
 Committee
 Revision Committee

In accordance with the status, §18 1: The term of office of the Federation's authorities lasts 4 years, and their election takes place in an open or secret voting, depending on the resolution of the General Meeting.

See also 
 Official Website for members
 Official Website for public
 Website of PZK Kyokushin (a group cooperating with PZK)
 Polish Organistation of Kyokushinkai
 World Karate Federation

References 

Sports organizations established in 1980
1980 establishments in Poland
Karate in Poland
Karate organizations
Karate